Trhové Dušníky is a municipality and village in Příbram District in the Central Bohemian Region of the Czech Republic. It has about 400 inhabitants. It lies on the Litavka river.

Notable people
Moritz Hartmann (1821–1872), poet, politician and author
Karel Hartmann (1885–1944), ice hockey player and official

References

Villages in Příbram District